Maren is a marine energy management system used to minimize fuel usage, thereby reducing vessel operator's fuel cost and the harmful emissions.  Maren is developed by Marorka in Iceland.  Maren 2 was released in Q3 in 2005 and launched at the Icelandic Fisheries Exhibition that year.  Maren 2 was awarded the best new product at the exhibition.

Maren monitors the various energy systems onboard different types of vessels.  It puts operating en environmental parameters in an energy management context.  Maren uses simulation and optimization to deliver suggestions on how to improve the operation of the vessel to minimize fuel usage.

See also
Fuel management systems

External links
 

Energy conservation
Transport software